Paolo Lorenzi and Matteo Viola were the defending champions but chose not to participate.

James Cerretani and Philipp Oswald won the title after defeating Roberto Carballés Baena and Christian Garin 6–3, 6–2 in the final.

Seeds

Draw

References
 Main Draw

International Tennis Tournament of Cortina - Doubles